Bușteni is a small mountain town in the north of Prahova County, Muntenia, Romania. Its name literally means tree-logs in Romanian. One village, Poiana Țapului, is administratively part of the town, formerly a separate commune prior to 1950. According to the 2011 census, it has 8,894 inhabitants.

It is one of the most popular mountain resorts in Romania, with year-round tourism opportunities, including skiing and mountain climbing.

The town and the surrounding mountains were the site of military confrontations in 1916, during World War I (see Romania during World War I). The monument is lighted at night and is visible from virtually everywhere in Bușteni.

The main local industries are wood industry and tourism. Many holiday houses have been built in the town since the 2000s.

Also a new Information Tourism Center was set up near the City Hall.

People

Natives
Ovidiu Bali
Ion Cașa
Marian Chițescu
Dan Cristea
Victor Fontana
Vasile Ionescu
Alina Vera Savin
Robert Taleanu

Honorary citizens
 Ana Maria Brânză: fencer
 Alina Dumitru: judoka
 Simona Halep: tennis player 
 Adrian Mutu: footballer

International relations

Bușteni is twinned with:
  Moissy-Cramayel, France, since 1993
  Djerba-Midoun, Tunisia, since 2000

Climate
Bușteni has a warm-summer humid continental climate (Dfb in the Köppen climate classification).

Image gallery

References

External links 
 Pictures and landscapes from the Carpathian Mountains
 Alpinet, Website about Carpathian Mountains
  Bușteni sensitive map, Kalinderu ski slope–accommodation hotels, boarding houses–Links
 Bușteni Tourist Office

Towns in Romania
Prahova Valley
Ski areas and resorts in Romania
Populated places in Prahova County
Localities in Muntenia